Luis Ramón Valle Sánchez (born December 29, 1964) is a Cuban jazz pianist and composer.

Life and career
Valle was born on December 29, 1964, in Holguín, Cuba. He left Cuba in the 1990s.

Playing style
An NPR reviewer of Valle's Take Off commented that "When Ramon Valle keeps it crisp, he can hardly go wrong, with percolating bass and drums at his back. But the pianist also has a more romantic, even schmaltzy side, where he tries to wow you with a ballad. Then he may show off his technique in a way that doesn't help".

Discography
An asterisk (*) after the year indicates that it is the year of release.

As leader/co-leader

As sideman

Notes

References

1964 births
Cuban jazz pianists
Living people
21st-century pianists
ACT Music artists